Yuvarathnaa is a 2021 Indian Kannada-language action drama film written and directed by Santhosh Ananddram. produced by Vijay Kiragandur under the banner Hombale Films, it stars Puneeth Rajkumar, Sayyeshaa, Dhananjay, Prakash Raj, Diganth, and Sai Kumar. The music for the film was composed by Thaman S, while the cinematography and editing was handled by Venkatesh Anguraj and Jnaanesh B. Matad, respectively. The film was theatrically released on 1 April 2021. The film received generally positive reviews from critics and audiences alike, with appreciation for Puneeth's performance.

Plot
Yuvarathnaa begins with RK-University student Sameera's suicide after failing her CET exam despite being a brilliant student. Gurudev Deshmukh, who is the principal of RK-University and Sameera's teacher is distraught and files a petition against private colleges for depriving public institutions of funds and declining opportunities to bright students studied in Government Colleges with the support of his former student Samarth Bhagwath, who is the present-Bangalore DC and Education minister Raghav Reddy. Antony Joseph, who runs the private colleges for his benefit, retaliates by sending gangsters across the state to stop the petition, but are warned and thrashed by the student leader Arjun, who is kicked out for going against the college. 

Arjun gets himself admitted into RK University as a student only to learn that Antony Joseph has sent goons, disguised as students as they want to ruin the students by disrupting their studies using harassment and drug supply. Arjun  meets Vandana, a medical lecturer in the University, and they are attracted to each other. However, Vandana suspects Arjun when she witnesses him packing drugs and keeping them in library books. Arjun runs into a person, who recognises him and his intentions, Arjun takes the person's place and meets with Antony and his gang, where he finds that Raghava Reddy and RK-University's Vice Principal Jayapal are in cahoots with Antony Joseph. The duo were responsible for Sameera's suicide and were posing as Gurudev's ally, The mysterious person was a hitman who was hired by Raghav Reddy to assassinate Gurudev. 

However, Arjun foils their attempt and it is revealed he was actually supplying anti-drug medicines to cure the students with the help of librarian Govind. Gurudev arrives at the college and checks Arjun's file after Arjun lands in trouble for disturbing the college premises by thrashing the goons. Gurudev is shocked to see Arjun's file where he reveals that Arjun is actually Yuvaraj, an intelligent student suffering from anger management issues who was expelled 12 years back for manhandling a lecturer. Arjun (Yuvaraj) reveals the truth to Gurudev, who expels Jayapal from the college. Gurudev learns from Govind that Arjun had thrashed the lecturer as he was about to assault a female student and had become a renowned professor himself. 

Gurudev apologizes to Arjun and appoints him as the professor of the university. After clearing up the misunderstandings with Vandana, the two renew their relationship. As the lecturer, Arjun cleverly motivates his students and encourages them to take more control of their education and follow their dreams. Antony Joseph makes various attempts to make the college fail the reopening standards. After an incident where the kabaddi team's glucose is swapped for illegal chemicals which causes the college's disqualification from the Kabaddi tournament. Arjun realises that Samarth is also in cahoots with Antony, who was sent as a spy to provide information. 

After Samarth is exposed, Antony Joseph and his gang conspire to disrupt the exams. Realising their plan, Arjun patrols the college and stops various goons posing as exam invigilators from impeding the students. Despite some attempts, the exams proceed peacefully. Meanwhile, Samarth realises his mistakes and confesses the gang's activities to Yuva and Samrat's common friend Inspector Azad, leading to Raghav Reddy and Antony Joseph getting arrested for their crimes. The students's results are announced and everyone passes the exams with flying colors and celebrate. Arjun, along with other students are celebrating for RK-University 100th-year celebration where Gurudev hands over the chairman post of the University to Arjun.

Cast 

 Puneeth Rajkumar as Arjun/ Yuvaraj, a lecturer in RK University (Engineering Department) & Vandhana's love interest
 Sayyeshaa as Vandhana, a lecturer in RK University and Yuvaraj's love interest (Medical Department)
 Dhananjay as Antony Joseph
 Prakash Raj as Gurudev Deshmukh, the Principal of RK University
 Diganth as DC Samarth Baghwath
 Sai Kumar as Raghav Reddy, State Education Minister
 Sonu Gowda as lawyer
 Vishal Hegde as journalist
 Tarak Ponnappa as Inspector Azad
 Rajesh Nataranga as Professor
 Chi. Guru Dutt as Professor
 Sudharani as Professor
 Rangayana Raghu as a staff
 Sadhu Kokila as Dr Kokila Raman
 Achyuth Kumar as Librarian Govind
 Prakash Belawadi as Shatrughan Salimath
 Avinash as Vice Principal Jayapal
 Triveni Rao as a Squad Member
 Aru Gowda
 Kavya Shetty  in a special appearance in the song "Feel the Power"
 Nagabhushana as Doctor
 Ravishankar Gowda as a Computer science professor
 John Kokken
 Kuri Prathap as peon
 Lohithaswa in a cameo appearance
 B. Jayashree in a cameo appearance
 Nagathihalli Chandrasekhar in a cameo appearance
 Aruna Balraj
 Yamuna Srinidhi
 Ravi Bhat
 Usha Bhandary
 Sundar
 Veena Sundar
 Shankar Bhat
 Rockline Sudhakar
 Prakash Thuminad
 Shankar Ashwath
 Venkatesh Adiga
 Jennifer Antony
 Chitkala Biradar
 K V Nagaraja Murthy
 Sundeep Malani as College Principal

Production

Development 
Puneeth Rajkumar was reported to sign his next film with Santhosh Ananddram, after completing the production works of his film Natasaarvabhowma (2019). The film marks the second collaboration between Puneeth Rajkumar and Ananddram after Raajakumara (2017). Vijay Kiragandur of Hombale Films was reported to produce the film after working on the duo's previous flick. On 10 October 2018, the makers announced that the film's title will be launched by one of his lucky fans, and also stated that the team might consider using a title from  Rajkumar’s 200-odd films, but might contain a new element. On 23 October 2018, Puneeth Raajkumar took to Instagram to announce that the entire Raajakumara team (which consists of Puneeth Rajkumar, Ananddram, music composer V. Harikrishna and Hombale Films) will be joining this project. An event to launch the film's title was held at the Cauvery Theatre in Bangalore on 1 November 2018 (Kannada Rajyotsava), where the title was revealed to be Yuvarathnaa. According to reports, Puneeth Rajkumar would play a college student in the film, for which he lost weight.

Casting 
On 1 December 2018, the team hosted auditions for budding actors and actresses to feature in the film. The makers reported that around 200 new talents were auditioned and shortlisted. Initially, Tamannaah was set to play the female lead, which would have been her full-fledged Kannada debut after appearing in item numbers in Jaguar (2016) and K.G.F: Chapter 1 (2019); however it was later reported that Tamil actress Sayyeshaa was confirmed for the role. Dhananjay and Vasishta N. Simha were roped in for the film, appearing in negative roles. Arun Gowda was reported to be cast in the film. Veteran Tamil actress Raadhika Sarathkumar joined the cast in March 2019, marking her comeback in Kannada film industry after 32 years. Her last appearance in a Kannada film was in the 1987 film Sathyam Shivam Sundaram; however, she did not appear in the final cut of the film. Boman Irani was reported to play a pivotal role in the film, making his debut in Kannada.

Prominent filmmaker Bhagavan made his acting debut in the film, alongside bodybuilder Mamatha Sanathkumar who made her Kannada debut. Triveni Rao confirmed her presence in the film in June 2019. In July 2019, Prakash Raj and Diganth joined the film's cast. Diganth's role was revealed to be a deputy commissioner in the film. The very same month, Sonu Gowda also joined the cast of the film. On 9 December 2019, Pavan, son of Kannada filmmaker Narayan, joined the sets of the film.

Composer V. Harikrishna opted out of the project citing schedule conflicts and was replaced by Thaman S as the music director. Dhilip Subbarayan, who choreographed the action sequences in Saaho (2019), was roped in as the action director.

Filming 
The film had a formal launch in the presence of its cast and crew on 12 December 2018. The principal photography of the film began on 14 February 2019 in Dharwad, and wrapped up within six days. The film's second schedule started in Maharaja's College in Mysore in late February. The third schedule of the film kickstarted on 22 March. During the intermediate schedule on 8 April 2019, Puneeth's elder brother Raghavendra Rajkumar visited the sets. After a long break, the team resumed the fifth schedule of shoot in Dharwad in June 2019.

It was reported that the team may kickstart the song shoot before November 2019. On 1 February 2020, Santhosh Ananddram tweeted about the song shoot choreographed by Jani Master. In late February, sources reported that two songs will be filmed in Europe, from late February to early March 2020. Amidst a coronavirus scare, the makers decided to shoot the songs in Austria and Slovenia. Due to the COVID-19 pandemic, the makers called off the overseas shooting schedules, and the film's shoot was further affected by pandemic-related restrictions.

On 26 September 2020, Puneeth Rajkumar and his team resumed the final schedule for two songs in India. On 12 October 2020, the team announced that they have wrapped the shoot of the film.

Music 

The film's music is composed by Thaman S, who worked with Puneeth Rajkumar in Power (2014) and Chakravyuha (2016). Yuvarathnaa marks Thaman's first collaboration with Santhosh Ananddram, replacing his regular collaborator V. Harikrishna for his films Mr. and Mrs. Ramachari (2014) and Raajakumara (2017).

Release

Theatrical 
Yuvarathnaa was originally slated to release on the eve of Dussehra, on 7 October 2019. However, the delay in the post-production works of the film made the makers postpone its release to December 2019, later to January 2020. In late December, the makers announced that the film will be released on 3 April 2020. However, in late February 2020, the makers announced that the film's release will be rescheduled for 8 May 2020, which was further postponed due to the COVID-19 pandemic in India.

In November 2020, it was announced that film will also be released in dubbed versions of Telugu, Tamil and Hindi languages along with the Kannada version.  On the occasion of New Year's Day, the makers announced new theatrical release dates of 1 April 2021 in India, 31 March 2021 in USA and 10 April 2021 in Singapore.

Home media 
The film, along with its dubbed versions, was made available to stream a week later through Amazon Prime Video on 9 April 2021 due to the COVID-19 restrictions in Karnataka  and was telecasted on Udaya TV on 14 January 2022, during the eve of Makara Sankranthi.

Awards

References

External links 
 

2020s Kannada-language films
2021 action drama films
2021 films
Films about the education system in India
Films set in universities and colleges
Films shot in Bangalore
Films shot in Karnataka
Indian action drama films
Indian gangster films
Indian nonlinear narrative films
Films scored by Thaman S
2020s masala films
Political action films
Films directed by Santhosh Ananddram